The 2016 NCAA Division I Men's Lacrosse Championship was the 46th annual single-elimination tournament to determine the national championship for National Collegiate Athletic Association (NCAA) Division I men's college lacrosse. Eighteen teams competed in the tournament, chosen by either winning an automatic qualifying conference tournament or as an at-large bid based on their performance during the regular season. The participating teams were announced on May 8.

North Carolina won the title, defeating Maryland 14–13 in overtime in the final, becoming the first unseeded team to win the championship. Chris Cloutier had 19 goals and 3 assists in the tournament, including 9 goals against Loyola in the semifinals. The 19 goals is a tournament record.

Tournament overview 
The play-in games were played at campus sites on May 11. The first round games were played at campus sites on May 14 and 15.  The quarterfinal games were played on May 21, 2016 at Brown Stadium in Providence, Rhode Island, and May 22, 2016 at Ohio Stadium in Columbus, Ohio.

The semifinals were contested on May 28, 2016, and the championship on May 30, 2016.  The semifinals and championship were held at Lincoln Financial Field in Philadelphia, and hosted by Drexel University.

Schools from 10 conferences, the America East Conference, Atlantic Coast Conference (ACC), Big East Conference, Colonial Athletic Association (CAA), Big Ten Conference, Ivy League, Metro Atlantic Athletic Conference (MAAC), Northeast Conference (NEC), Patriot League, and Southern Conference (SoCon) received automatic bids into the tournament by winning their respective conference tournaments, leaving eight remaining at-large bids for top ranked teams. The top fourteen seeds were placed directly into the bracket, and the four lowest seeds met in play-in games to the Sweet 16.

In the finals, Maryland was ahead by two goals with over seven minutes to play before Carolina tied the game. A potential game winning goal by Colin Heacock of Maryland went off the crossbar with just over a minute left in regulation. The game went into overtime where Kyle Bernlohr made a miracle save for Maryland, but the Terps were called for a one minute penalty on the play. On the man up, Michael Tagliaferri found Chris Cloutier uncovered at the top of the key, and he beat Bernlohr low for the winning goal. This was North Carolina's fifth national title.

Teams

Bracket 

 * = Overtime

Tournament boxscores

Tournament Finals

Tournament Semi-Finals

Tournament Quarterfinals

Tournament First Round

References

External links
 Tournament statistics via NCAA
 

NCAA Division I Men's Lacrosse Championship
NCAA Division I Men's Lacrosse Championship
 
NCAA Division I Men's Lacrosse
Sports in Philadelphia
Lacrosse in Pennsylvania